is a sub-kilometer asteroid, classified as near-Earth object and potentially hazardous asteroid of the Aten group, approximately  in diameter. It was discovered on 6 December 1994, by Scottish–Australian astronomer Robert McNaught at Siding Spring Observatory in Australia. It was one of the first asteroids discovered to have a semi-major axis less than Venus.

Orbit and classification 

 orbits the Sun at a distance of 0.3–1.0 AU once every 0 years and 7 months (201 days). Its orbit has an eccentricity of 0.53 and an inclination of 28° with respect to the ecliptic. No precoveries were taken, and no prior identifications were made. The body's observation arc begins with its official discovery observation.

Close encounter 

It passed  from Earth on 6 December 1994.

Physical characteristics 

 has not been observed by any of the space-based surveys such as the Infrared Astronomical Satellite IRAS, the Japanese Akari satellite, and NASA's Wide-field Infrared Survey Explorer with its subsequent NEOWISE mission. Based on a generic magnitude-to-diameter conversion,  measures approximately 0.2 kilometers in diameter assuming an albedo of 0.20, which is a typical value for stony S-type asteroids.

As of 2017, no rotational lightcurve of this object has been obtained. The body's rotation period, shape and poles remain unknown.

Naming and numbering 

After its first observation in 1994, this minor planet was numbered 23 years later by the Minor Planet Center on 12 January 2017, after its last observation with the LCO–A 1-meter global telescope station at Sutherland, South Africa, on 6 December 2016 . As of 2018, the asteroid has not been named .

References

External links 
 Asteroid Lightcurve Database (LCDB), query form (info )
 Dictionary of Minor Planet Names, Google books
 Asteroids and comets rotation curves, CdR – Observatoire de Genève, Raoul Behrend
 
 
 

480808
Discoveries by Robert H. McNaught
480808
19941206